Ralf Becker (born 26 September 1970) is a German former football player and coach who works as the sports director of Dynamo Dresden.

Playing career

Becker spent a significant portion of his time as a youth player with VfB Stuttgart, as well as with their smaller rival club Stuttgarter Kickers.

In 1993, he first entered into professional competition by leaving TSF Ditzingen and joining Bundesliga side Bayer 04 Leverkusen, with whom he reached the quarterfinals of the UEFA Cup Winners' Cup in the following year. In 1995, he moved to FC St. Pauli, another Bundesliga team, where he only stayed one season. Following a brief return to TSF Ditzingen in 1998–1999, he spent the remaining years of his playing career with 2. Bundesliga teams SSV Reutlingen 05 and Karlsruher SC, before retiring in 2006.

Coaching and managerial career
Becker acted as the Karlsruher SC's assistant coach under Edmund Becker (no relation) from 2006–2009, after which he coached SSV Ulm 1846, a Regionalliga Süd team, for little more than one year. Since stepping back from this position on 30 November 2010, he has not worked as a coach.

From 2010 to 2016, Becker was VfB Stuttgart's chief of scouting. He then became Holstein Kiel's managing director. Under his direction, the club secured a promotion to the 2. Bundesliga in 2016–2017, and only narrowly missed out on a subsequent promotion to the Bundesliga the following year.

On 28 May 2018, Becker joined the newly relegated Hamburger SV as their managing director. He controversially replaced head coach Christian Titz with Hannes Wolf in October 2018, despite his team being merely two points behind the top of the table at the time.

On 25 June 2020, Dynamo Dresden announced Becker as their new sports director, following the departure of Ralf Minge. After their relegation in the 2019–20 season, he oversaw the club's immediate return to the 2. Bundesliga.

Personal life
Becker is married and has three children.

References

External links
 
 

1970 births
Living people
German footballers
Association football midfielders
Bayer 04 Leverkusen players
FC St. Pauli players
Stuttgarter Kickers players
SSV Reutlingen 05 players
Karlsruher SC players
Karlsruher SC managers
Hamburger SV non-playing staff
Dynamo Dresden non-playing staff
German football managers
SSV Ulm 1846 managers
People from Leonberg
Sportspeople from Stuttgart (region)
Footballers from Baden-Württemberg